The swimming competition at the 2007 South Pacific Games in Apia, Samoa was held:
pool: August 27-September 1 at the Samoa Aquatic Centre in the Faleata Sports Complex; and 
open water: Monday, September 3 at the Aggie Grey's Complex, in Faleolo.
All pool events were swum in a long-course (50m) pool; the open water events were 5-kilometres in length (5K).

Event schedule

Monday, September 3: men's and women's 5,000m Open Water swim.

Note: The 2007 swimming event schedule is the same as that of the 2003 South Pacific Games, save the nomenclature change on the relays from "400" to "4x100" and "800" to "4x200".

Results
Papua New Guinea's Ryan Pini dominate the men's competition, winning eight individual gold medals. In the women's competition, Lara Grangeon from New Caledonia won seven individual gold medals (including the open water swim) and two more gold in the relays.

Men

Women

Participating countries
125 swimmers from 10 countries were entered in the swimming events at the 2007 Games—a record—with Tokelau and the Marshall Islands participating in the SPG Swimming events for the first time. Countries entered in the swimming competition are:

Notes

Sources

External links
2007 South Pacific Games — Swimming website; retrieved 2009-07-06.

2007 South Pacific Games
2007 in swimming
Swimming at the Pacific Games